Mark Linn-Baker (born June 17, 1954) is an American actor and director who played Benjy Stone in the film My Favorite Year and Larry Appleton in the television sitcom Perfect Strangers.

Early life and education 
Mark Linn-Baker was born with the given names Mark Linn and the surname Baker in St. Louis, Missouri. He later changed his surname to a compound surname by hyphenating his middle name Linn with his surname Baker, producing Linn-Baker. His mother, Joan (née Sparks), was a dancer, and his father, William Nelson Baker, co-founded the Open Stage Theater in Hartford. His parents were both active in theatre and participated in civil rights activism. He graduated from Wethersfield High School in Wethersfield, Connecticut, in 1972, and from Yale University in 1976. He then attended the Yale School of Drama, receiving a MFA in Drama in 1979, and following that, found most of his early roles on stage.

Career 
He developed and performed in a two-man comedy show, The Laundry Hour, with Lewis Black, in the early 1980s.

He appeared in the 1983 Broadway version of the Doonesbury comic strip. He appeared in Laughter on the 23rd Floor in 1993; the 1996 revival of A Funny Thing Happened on the Way to the Forum; the 1998 Roundabout Theatre Company production of A Flea in Her Ear; the 2003 musical A Year with Frog and Toad; and the 2006 comedy Losing Louie.

His film debut was a small part in Woody Allen's 1979 film Manhattan. The majority of Linn-Baker's scenes were cut from the film. Three years later, he landed a far more memorable film role partly inspired by Allen himself, playing Benjy Stone in the 1982 comedy film My Favorite Year alongside Peter O'Toole. In a manner similar to his future role in Perfect Strangers, Linn-Baker played the straight man to O'Toole's outrageous character, Alan Swann.

Having attained success on stage and the big screen, Linn-Baker began to turn his sights toward television. In 1983, he appeared in an unsold detective show pilot called O'Malley. The following year saw a role on the television movie, The Ghost Writer, and in the summer series, The Comedy Zone. Soon, Linn-Baker was appearing in several high-profile television shows. He guest-starred on a 1984 episode of Miami Vice as Bonzo Barry and portrayed hapless office worker Phil West on a 1985 episode of Moonlighting titled "Atlas Belched". Linn-Baker starred with Charles Kimbrough in the 1985 CBS pilot The Recovery Room, a sitcom about a bar located across from a major city hospital and its inhabitants. Airing as a special that summer, the pilot did not lead to a regular series. Between parts, Linn-Baker also appeared during this time in television commercials pitching products ranging from Kellogg's Nutri-Grain to Kraft's Life Savers.

Linn-Baker starred in the ABC series Perfect Strangers as Larry Appleton, a young man living on his own for the first time in Chicago. Larry's world was disrupted when a distant cousin from the (fictional) Mediterranean island of Mypos, Balki Bartokomous (Bronson Pinchot), showed up on his doorstep. Storylines revolved around Larry's attempts to show Balki the ways of American culture, although the neurotic Larry frequently proved to be just as naive as Balki. The series ran for eight seasons. Later, he appeared in Peter Bogdanovich's 1992 film Noises Off.

In 2005, he was a regular cast member on the WB Network sitcom Twins, which was canceled after a single season. He also appeared in the 2010 film How Do You Know as Ron. In 2011, he starred in his sixth Broadway show Relatively Speaking in a one-act play by Woody Allen. He previously appeared opposite Nathan Lane in A Funny Thing Happened on the Way to the Forum. In 2016 he appeared off-Broadway as Sir Peter Teazle in The School for Scandal at the Lucille Lortel Theatre. As of 2017 he is playing the role of Carlton Miller, aide to Mayor Margaret Dutton (Lorraine Bracco) on the CBS police procedural drama Blue Bloods.

Guest appearances 
On a 1992 episode of Full House, Linn-Baker played Dick Donaldson, the wealthy, snobbish cousin of Becky Donaldson Katsopolis (Lori Loughlin). In 1997, he guest starred on Family Matters as the abusive boss of Harriette Winslow (Jo Marie Payton). Linn-Baker guested three times on Hangin' with Mr. Cooper as Larry Weeks. Additionally, he appeared on an episode of Law & Order as a strip club owner being extorted by the Mob. In a 1997 episode of Sesame Street, he had a guest role as a veterinarian examining a sick—and invisible—Barkley.

Linn-Baker also directed numerous episodes of Family Matters, Hangin' with Mr. Cooper, Step By Step and The Trouble with Larry. He appeared as a spokesperson for Peter Pan peanut butter in a series of commercials in the late 1980s and 1990s.

He also appeared in a Christmas episode of Ally McBeal as a man fired for seeing a unicorn.

On a 2003 episode of Law & Order: Criminal Intent, he guested as an insurance investigator named Wally Stevens who displays strong Asperger's Syndrome traits. He gets a degree of empathy from Det. Robert Goren and a number of behind-his-back snickers from Goren's partner Alexandra Eames. His character made a return cameo appearance in the season 6 episode "Endgame", where it was revealed Goren has kept in touch with the character through correspondence. In season 2, episode 14 ("Probability"), the last line spoken by Eames is "I'm sure he'd like a pen pal."

Linn-Baker provided the voice for one of a quartet of aardvarks in the 2002 Sandra Boynton album Philadelphia Chickens. The other three were voiced by Joe Grifasi, Michael Gross, and Devin McEwan.

He joined his friend, fellow Yale Drama School graduate and former sidekick Lewis Black, on the audiobook version of Black's second book Me of Little Faith where he and Black recreate The Laundry Hour, an act they did in New York City in the early 1980s. He guest-stars in several episodes of the children's TV show The Electric Company in February–March 2009 as "Uncle Sigmund Scrambler".

In 2009, he appeared in an episode of the U.S. version of Life on Mars, playing a character who collected women's underwear that he later used for masturbation. In 2010, he appeared in an episode of Law & Order, "The Taxman Cometh", as Dr. Vincent Balicheck, a physician who used controversial therapies on cancer patients which resulted in their deaths.

Linn-Baker and Perfect Strangers are referenced in the HBO TV series The Leftovers, which takes place after a fictional global event called the Sudden Departure, the inexplicable, simultaneous disappearance of 140 million people, 2% of the world's population. Within the show, the entire cast of Perfect Strangers has departed, except for Linn-Baker, who has faked his own departure and escaped to Mexico. Linn-Baker appears, as a fictional version of himself, in the episodes "Axis Mundi" and "Don't Be Ridiculous."

In 2009, he had a recurring guest-starring role in the revival of The Electric Company, and in 2017, he started a recurring role on the CBS drama Blue Bloods as Deputy NYC mayor Carlton Miller. In 2019, he appeared as Josh's father Dave in the Unbreakable Kimmy Schmidt episode "Kimmy is in a Love Square!" Also in 2019, he appeared in Season 6 (Episode 7) of The Blacklist as entomologist Dr. Jonathan Nikkila.

Personal life 
In 1995, Linn-Baker married Adrianne Lobel, the daughter of children's book author Arnold Lobel, best known for his Frog and Toad series. They divorced after having one daughter. Linn-Baker helped adapt his father-in-law's stories into the Tony-nominated Broadway musical A Year with Frog and Toad, in which Linn-Baker played Toad and Jay Goede played Frog. On December 29, 2012, Linn-Baker married actress Christa Justus.

Filmography

Television

Film

References

External links

1954 births
20th-century American male actors
21st-century American male actors
Male actors from Connecticut
American male film actors
American male stage actors
American male television actors
American television directors
Living people
People from Wethersfield, Connecticut
Male actors from St. Louis
Yale School of Drama alumni
Yale University alumni